Ingela Ericsson (born September 27, 1968) is a Swedish sprint canoer who competed from the mid-1990s to the early 2000s (decade). Competing in two Summer Olympics, she won a bronze medal in the K-4 500 m event at Atlanta in 1996.

Ericsson also won four medals at the ICF Canoe Sprint World Championships with a silver (K-4 200 m: 1998) and three bronzes (K-4 200 m: 1995, 1997; K-4 500 m: 1994).

References
DatabaseOlympics.com profile

Sports-reference.com profile

1968 births
Canoeists at the 1996 Summer Olympics
Canoeists at the 2000 Summer Olympics
Living people
Olympic canoeists of Sweden
Olympic bronze medalists for Sweden
Swedish female canoeists
Olympic medalists in canoeing
ICF Canoe Sprint World Championships medalists in kayak
Medalists at the 1996 Summer Olympics
20th-century Swedish people
21st-century Swedish people